Bloom, Red & The Ordinary Girl (the title refers both to the Chicas' nicknames and lyrics on the album) is an alternative country album by Tres Chicas. Supported by Matt Radford and Geraint Watkins and produced by Nick Lowe collaborators Neil Brockbank and Robert Trehern, who also features on drums. Musically, the album tends to stick to easy tempos and sparse arrangements organized around acoustic guitar, keyboards and the Chicas' twining harmonies.

Track listing
"Drop Me Down"
"Stone Love Song"   
"My Love"   
"Shade Trees In Bloom"   
"Red"   
"Sway"   
"Only Broken"   
"Still I Run"  
"The Man of The People"   
"400 Flamingos"   
"Slip So Easily"   
"If You Think That It's All Right"

Personnel
Lynn Blakey – vocals
Caitlin Cary – vocals
Tonya Lamm – vocals
Geraint Watkins – piano, organ
Matt Radford – upright bass
Robert "Bobby" Trehern – drums
Nick Lowe
Steve Donnelly
Bob Loveday
Bill Kirchen
Produced by Neil Brockbank, Robert Trehern
Recorded at Goldtop Studios, London

References 

2006 albums
Tres Chicas albums
Yep Roc Records albums